Peter Gregson may refer to:

 Sir Peter Gregson (civil servant) (1936–2015), British civil servant
 Sir Peter Gregson (engineer) (born 1957), British engineer and university vice-chancellor
 Peter Gregson (cellist) (born 1987), British cellist and composer